Man of Many Many Faces or The Man with Two Thousand Faces is the sequel of Man of Many Faces. It is shown in Iran from March 21. Mehran Modiri is once again the director and main character for this TV show. It also stars Pejman Bazeghi, Reza Feiz Noroozi, Siamak Ansari and Borzoo Arjmand.

Plot
Man of Many Many Faces is about Masoud Shastchi (Mehran Modiri) once again finding himself in situations like in Man of Many Faces. The TV show starts off with Masoud sitting with the police officer Shahin Etemadi (Pejman Bazeghi) talking about what happened that he is back in court again. It then shows that Masoud goes back to Shiraz to his house to find that his parents have left and gone to a new place because they were embarrassed in front of the neighbours for their son's behaviour. After Masoud finds his parents he goes off to work to find out that his boss doesn't want him anymore. He then goes to the house of Sahar (Falamak Joneidi) and finds out she doesn't want to see him. So Masoud goes looking for a job and finally when he gets one as a wedding speaker, he gets assigned to go to Sahar's wedding and gets heartbroken when he sees her. Meanwhile, a guy has thought that Masoud is Mehran Modiri and asks him if he can star on a TV show. Seeing what has happened he agrees and goes back to Tehran to be Mehran Modiri. After the TV Show finished he met Siamak Ansari (Siamak Ansari) in a restaurant and with him he went to his house. He got very excited when he went in his house and suddenly met his snake. He yelled and screamed and finally killed the snake which the actual Mehran Modiri liked so much. He then went to the studio to get filmed on a movie they were working on and when he was about to escape and go away, he met Sahar Zakaria (Sahar Zakaria) in the doorway and couldn't go. He stays and they do filming and he doesn't do it right. After that he goes to the doctor and the doctor tells him he needs to marry someone. He thinks of Sahar Zakaria and tries to ask her but Siamak Ansari doesn't let him. Meanwhile, the real Mehran Modiri has arrived from Paris and gets puzzled that people and the doctor tell him he has been here for 2 days. He goes to his house to see what has happened and Masoud is there with Siamak Ansari but just as Mehran Modiri enters, Masoud goes to the toilet.....

Cast and characters
 Mehran Modiri as Masoud Shastchi
 Pejman Bazeghi as Shahin Etemadi
 Falamak Joneidi as Sahar Jandaghi
 Siamak Ansari as Siamak Ansari
 Sahar Zakaria as Sahar Zakaria
 Reza Feiz Noroozi as Mr Jandaghi
 Gholam Reza Nik-khah as Masoud's Father
 Parvin Ghaem-maghami as Masoud's Mother
 Mehran Modiri as Mehran Modiri
 Keyhan Maleki as Airport security manager
 Hadi Kazemi
 Sepand Amirsoleimani as Responsible for flight safety

Extra
Director: Mehran Modiri
Head-Writer: Peyman Ghasem Khani
Writers: Mehran Ghasem Khani, Amir Mahdi Jule and Khashayar Alvand
Producers: Majid Agha Golian, Hamid Agha Golian
Genre: Comedy
Number of Episodes: 13
Release Year: March 2009

References

External links
 

Iranian television series
2000s Iranian television series
2009 Iranian television series debuts
2009 Iranian television series endings
Islamic Republic of Iran Broadcasting original programming